Jesse Louis Lasky (September 13, 1880 – January 13, 1958) was an American pioneer motion picture producer who was a key founder of what was to become Paramount Pictures, and father of screenwriter Jesse L. Lasky Jr.

Early life

Born in to a Jewish family in San Francisco, California, Lasky worked at a variety of jobs but began his entertainment career as a vaudeville performer, playing the cornet in a duo act with his sister Blanche.

Career
In 1911, Lasky was the producer of two Broadway musicals: Hello, Paris and A La Broadway. Beatrice deMille was also producing plays on Broadway and she introduced him to her son Cecil B. DeMille.

Jesse L. Lasky Feature Play Company
In 1913 Lasky and his sister Blanche's husband, Samuel Goldwyn, teamed with DeMille and Oscar Apfel to form the Jesse L. Lasky Feature Play Company, with Lasky as president. With limited funds, they rented a barn near Los Angeles where they made Hollywood's first feature film, DeMille's The Squaw Man, which was a success. Known today as the Lasky-DeMille Barn, it is home to the Hollywood Heritage Museum. 

Other films produced by the studio include the original version of Brewster's Millions, The Call of the North, Cameo Kirby, The Circus Man, The Ghost Breaker, The Making of Bobby Burnit, The Man from Home, The Man on the Box, The Master Mind, The Only Son, The Virginian (all 1914), The Cheat, Carmen, Kindling (all 1915), The Blacklist (1916) and The Bottle Imp (1917).

Famous Players-Lasky
In 1916, Lasky's company merged with Adolph Zukor's rival company Famous Players Film Company to create Famous Players-Lasky Corporation, with Zukor as president and Lasky as vice-president in charge of production. In 1920, Famous Players-Lasky built a large studio facility in Astoria, New York, now known as the Kaufman Astoria Studios. Films produced by Lasky include What Every Woman Knows (1921), The Covered Wagon (1923), A Kiss for Cinderella (1925), Beau Geste (1926), Wings (1927). In September 1927, Famous Players-Lasky was reorganized under the name Paramount Famous Lasky Corporation, later becoming the Paramount Pictures Corporation.

In 1927, Lasky was one of the 36 people who founded the Academy of Motion Picture Arts and Sciences. His Wings was the first film to win the Academy Award for Best Picture.

Financial problems arose within the industry as a result of the Great Depression and Lasky resigned in 1932 after personally losing $12 million. Famous Players-Lasky went into receivership in 1933 and was folded into Paramount.

Other producing roles
He became an independent film producer and in 1935 formed a partnership with Mary Pickford to produce films but within a few years she dissolved their business relationship. He went on to produce a radio talent show.

Lasky then found work as an associate producer at RKO Pictures before becoming a producer at Warner Bros. until 1945 when he formed his own production company. At Warners he produced Sergeant York (1941), The Adventures of Mark Twain (1944) and Rhapsody in Blue (1945). His last film was The Great Caruso (1951). He became in debt to the Bureau of Internal Revenue and was preparing another production with Paramount, The Brass Band, to help pay off the debt but died before production started.

Personal life and death
Jesse L. Lasky died from a heart attack in Beverly Hills, aged 77. He is interred in Hollywood Forever Cemetery, adjacent to Paramount Studios, in Hollywood.

He and his wife Bessie had three children Jesse L. Jr., Betty and Billy.

In 1957 he published his autobiography, I Blow My Own Horn.

Legacy
For his contribution to the motion picture industry, Lasky has a star on the Hollywood Walk of Fame at 6433 Hollywood Boulevard. Lasky Drive in Beverly Hills was named in his honor.

References

External links

American film producers
American film studio executives
American film production company founders
Film producers from California
1880 births
1958 deaths
Academy of Motion Picture Arts and Sciences founders
Paramount Pictures executives
Vaudeville performers
American Jews
Burials at Hollywood Forever Cemetery
People from San Francisco